Love Park is located in downtown Toronto at 96 Queens Quay W, Toronto, Ontario and is by the City of Toronto and will be operated by Parks, Forestry, and Recreation on completion. Construction on Love Park began in July 2021 and is planned to be completed in the fall of 2022.  An official opening will occur in Spring 2023.

Project site

Love Park's site is the former plot of the York-Bay-Yonge eastbound off-ramp of the Gardiner Expressway. The off ramp was removed in 2016–2017 to reclaim the space for the community by allowing for the widening of Harbour Street to improve pedestrian and cyclist access to the waterfront. The allotted space is 2 acres in the financial district of the Toronto harbourfront. The allotted budget for the construction of the park is approximately $7 million. The project was planned to break ground in 2019 though due to delays was not started until 2021.

Design

Love Park was designed by Claude Cormier Associés, a firm based out of Montréal. They also worked with gh3*, an architecture firm in Toronto. “The park was designed to be an alter ego for its surroundings of large and reflective glass clad structures.” The design of Love Park follows a classic design strategy with a central water installation surrounded by lush green spaces. This strategy is reflected in parks and installations around the world and has been utilized for generations. This design strategy is also seen in Natrel Rink, Nathan Philips Square, and Paul Quarrington Ice Rink and Splash Pad. These are three public spaces that are in close proximity to Love Park and similarly have central water features. Love park is a continuation of Toronto's efforts to revitalize its harbourfront community and bring green spaces to areas dominated by skyscrapers.

Features

Love Park has a number of features to augment the space. The largest such feature is the heart shaped reflecting pool in the middle of the park. “Within the reflecting pool it will have a small island with red and pink flowers as well as a large, illuminated heart that will be suspended above.” The reflecting pool will be a central water feature in the summer and turn into a skating rink during the winter months giving year-round utility. The park also will have a fully mirrored arcade that creates a functional pavilion that's interior houses a universal washroom and a coffee kiosk for park goers to utilize while providing shelter from the elements for a number of seating areas. The pavilion will be a space for residents of the community, people who work in the commercial buildings, and tourists to have a rest, eat lunch, or have a morning coffee while experiencing the park. Love Park also has several clearings and platforms for the display of public art installations and to facilitate small gatherings.

References

Bibliography 

 Canadian Architect. (2018, October 10). Winning designs chosen for Toronto's Rees and York Street parks. Canadian Architect. Retrieved January 28, 2022, from https://www.canadianarchitect.com/winning-designs-chosen-for-torontos-rees-and-york-street-parks/
 City of Toronto. (2017, February 8). Eastbound ramp from Gardiner Expressway to York/Bay/Yonge streets to be demolished, replaced with New Ramp. City of Toronto. Retrieved April 12, 2022, from https://www.toronto.ca/news/eastbound-ramp-from-gardiner-expressway-to-york-bay-yonge-streets-to-be-demolished-replaced-with-new-ramp/
 City of Toronto. (n.d.). Love Park. Love Park. Retrieved February 8, 2022, from https://waterfrontoronto.ca/nbe/portal/waterfront/Home/waterfronthome/projects/york+street+park#:~:text=Construction%20of%20Love%20Park%20began,in%20the%20fall%20of%202022.
 Landau, J. (2022, January 13). Toronto's stunning new heart-shaped park is quickly becoming a reality. blogTO. Retrieved February 30, 2022, from https://www.blogto.com/city/2022/01/toronto-heart-shaped-park/
 Love Park. Love Park. (n.d.). Retrieved February 1, 2022, from https://www.claudecormier.com/en/projet/love-park/
 10 proposals, two green spaces: Exploring Toronto's New Waterfront Parks. Azure Magazine. (2019, June 6). Retrieved February 1, 2022, from https://www.azuremagazine.com/article/toronto-new-waterfront-parks/

Wikipedia Student Program
Parks in Toronto